It's Always Sunny in Philadelphia is an American comedy television series created by Rob McElhenney, and developed by McElhenney and Glenn Howerton, who also serve as writers and executive producers with Charlie Day. The series premiered on August 4, 2005, on FX, and moved to its sister network FXX beginning with its ninth season. The series follows "The Gang", a group of five narcissistic underachievers: twins Dennis (Howerton) and Deandra "Sweet Dee" Reynolds (Kaitlin Olson), their friends Charlie Kelly (Day) and Ronald  "Mac" McDonald (McElhenney), and their legal father Frank Reynolds (Danny DeVito), who run Paddy's Pub, a run-down bar in South Philadelphia.

On December 10, 2020, the series was renewed through an eighteenth season, which would make it the longest-running live-action comedy series in American television history. The fifteenth season, which also saw the series break The Adventures of Ozzie and Harriet's record for longest running live-action sitcom in U.S. history, premiered on December 1, 2021.

Series overview

Episodes

Season 1 (2005)

Season 2 (2006)

Season 3 (2007)

Season 4 (2008)

Season 5 (2009)

Season 6 (2010)

Season 7 (2011)

Season 8 (2012)

Season 9 (2013)

Season 10 (2015)

Season 11 (2016)

Season 12 (2017)

Season 13 (2018)

Season 14 (2019)

Season 15 (2021)

References

External links 
 
 
 

Episodes
Lists of American sitcom episodes
Lists of black comedy television series episodes